The Sydney Wolf Pack are an Australian junior ice hockey team based in Sydney playing in the Australian Junior Ice Hockey League. They represent one of the two junior ice hockey teams from New South Wales currently playing in the AJIHL, which is the most elite level for ice hockey at a national level for ages between 16–20 years old.

Team history

AJIHL

The Sydney Maple Leafs were founded 18 September 2012 following the announcement by Ice Hockey Australia of the formation of the Australian Junior Ice Hockey League. The team is controlled by the New South Wales Ice Hockey Association. On 14 October 2012 it was announced that Sydney Bears player Steven Adams and Paul Kelly had signed on as coaches for the 2012–13 AJIHL season.

The first team in club history:
For the 2012–13 AJIHL season

AJIHL expansion

The follow up season in the Australian Junior Ice Hockey League saw a lot of change via expansion and renaming of its existing teams. The Sydney Maple Leafs were renamed the Sydney Wolf Pack in September 2013. The changes were made in response to the National Hockey Leagues concern about the AJIHL using their team names and logos but also recognised the opportunity to create a new history for the teams through creating their own identity. In October 2013 the league expanded to six teams with two teams from Perth, the Sharks and the Pelicans, joining for the start of the 2013–14 season.

Logo and uniform

2012–2013 Sydney Maple Leafs

In their first year, and the inaugural AJIHL season, the Sydney Maple Leafs wore a uniform that resembled the NHL namesake Toronto Maple Leafs. The key difference with the logo design was the exclusion of the word Toronto within the leaf emblem. The jersey design and uniform otherwise bore close resemblance to the Toronto Maple Leaf design, with the AJIHL logo used for shoulder crests.

2013–present Sydney Wolf Pack

Season by season results

2012 – 2013

In the inaugural season of the Australian Junior Ice Hockey League, the Sydney Wolf Pack began as the Sydney Maple Leafs. The beginning of the regular season saw the team not winning a game with the closest contest being an overtime loss to the Sydney Lightning. The Sydney Maple Leafs would record their first win as a club on 8 December 2012 against the Sydney Lightning in a 2–1 victory. Both goals scored in this historic win were scored by forward Dexter Crowe in the 2nd period about 5 minutes apart.

After starting off without a win, the Sydney Maple Leafs would go on to win 4 out of their last 6 games, one of which was in overtime.

In the post season finals, the Sydney Maple Leafs would continue their improved from by defeating the Sydney Lightning by a convincing 7–2 scoreline in the semi-finals. The finals series would be against the Melbourne Red Wings in a best of 3 format. The Sydney Maple Leafs won the series 2–1 after winning the final game of the series 1–0 from a first period goal by forward Scott Clemie.

2013 – 2014

The follow up season in the Australian Junior Ice Hockey League saw a lot of change via expansion and renaming of its existing teams. The Sydney Maple Leafs were renamed the Sydney Wolf Pack in September 2013. The changes were made in response to the National Hockey Leagues concern about the AJIHL using their team names and logos but also recognised the opportunity to create a new history for the teams through creating their own identity. In October 2013 the league expanded to six teams with two teams from Perth, the Sharks and the Pelicans, joining for the start of the 2013–14 season.
The finals format of a best of 3 was discontinued and the league adopted a gold-silver-bronze format which saw the 4th place Sydney Wolf Pack miss out on post season competition.

2014 – 2015

Players

Current roster
For the 2016–17 AJIHL season

Captains
 2014–15 Scott Clemie (C), Patrick Nadin (A)
 2015–16 Patrick Nadin (C)
 2016–17 Jake Knott(C), Luke Zvonicek (A), Brenden Kong (A)

Head coaches
The first head coach for the Sydney Maple Leafs in the inaugural year for the AJIHL was Steven Adams.

 2012–13 Steven Adams
 2013–14 Scott Stephenson
 2014–15 Andrew Reynolds
 2015–16 Amelia Matheson
 2016–17 Amelia Matheson

Awards and trophies

See also

Australian Junior Ice Hockey League
Sydney Sabres
Melbourne Glaciers
Melbourne Whalers
Perth Pelicans
Perth Sharks
Ice Hockey Australia
Ice Hockey New South Wales
Australian Women's Ice Hockey League
Australian Ice Hockey League
Jim Brown Trophy
Goodall Cup
Joan McKowen Memorial Trophy

References

Australian Junior Ice Hockey League
Ice hockey teams in Australia
Sports teams in Sydney
2012 establishments in Australia
Ice hockey clubs established in 2012